Isonandra montana is a plant species first described in 1860.

Isonandra montana is a small tree up to 10 meters tall, native to Sri Lanka and possibly to the Western Ghats of India.

The Latin specific epithet montana refers to mountains or coming from mountains.

References

montana
Flora of India (region)
Trees of Sri Lanka
Plants described in 1860